"When I'm Back on My Feet Again" is the fourth single released from American singer-songwriter Michael Bolton's sixth studio album, Soul Provider (1989). The song was written by Diane Warren, who wrote the song after the death of her father. She is quoted as saying that "the song wrote itself...I was thinking about my dad who had recently passed away, and it just came pouring out."

The song peaked at  7 on the US Billboard Hot 100 in August 1990, becoming Bolton's third top-10 hit in the United States. It also spent three weeks atop the Billboard Hot Adult Contemporary Tracks chart, Bolton's second No. 1 on this chart following "How Am I Supposed to Live Without You". Worldwide, "When I'm Back on My Feet Again" peaked at No. 2 in Canada, No. 20 in Ireland, No. 35 in New Zealand, No. 44 in the United Kingdom, and No. 77 in Australia.

Credits and personnel

Musicians
 Michael Bolton: Main Vocal
 Chris Camozzi, Michael Landau: Guitars
 Neil Stubenhaus: Electric Bass
 Diane Warren: Keyboards
 Walter Afanasieff: Keyboards, Synthesized Bass, Drums, Percussion
 Louis Biancaniello: Additional Keyboard Programming
 Dan Shea, Ren Klyce: Additional Synth Programming

Production
 Arranged by Guy Roche
 Produced by Guy Roche, Michael Bolton and Walter Afanasieff
 Production Co-ordination: Doreen Dorian
 Recording Engineers: Guy Roche, Richard Piatt and Terry Christian; assisted by Kevin Becka and Tony Friedman
 Mixed by Mick Guzauski
 Published by RealSongs

Charts

Weekly charts

Year-end charts

In popular culture
This song was featured in Rocky V, but only in the Director's Cut version.

References

1989 songs
1990 singles
Columbia Records singles
Michael Bolton songs
Songs written by Diane Warren